The following is a list of major ports in Romania.

On the Black Sea
Port of Constanţa
Port of Mangalia
Port of Midia
Port of Sulina

On the Danube–Black Sea Canal
Port of Basarabi
Port of Luminița
Port of Medgidia
Port of Ovidiu

On the Danube River
Port of Bechet
Port of Brăila
Port of Calafat
Port of Călărași
Port of Cernavodă
Port of Corabia
Port of Drencova
Port of Drobeta Turnu Severin
Port of Galați
Port of Giurgiu
Port of Isaccea
Port of Moldova Veche
Port of Oltenița
Port of Orșova
Port of Tulcea
Port of Turnu Mǎgurele
Port of Zimnicea

External links
Ports in Romania 

 
Romania